Geneva English School (GES) is a British international primary and secondary school with campuses in Genthod, Canton of Geneva, Switzerland and Versoix, Canton of Geneva, Switzerland.

Founded in 1961, the school offers an enhanced UK national curriculum with a strong focus on French language. In 2015 the school opened a new secondary campus, which has been growing organically year on year. GES currently educates 3 - 18 year olds and will be an all-through school by 2022.

Inspection reports
In March 2017, Geneva English School was inspected by Independent Schools Inspectorate (ISI) and given the highest grade possible of "Excellent" in all aspects.

Accreditation
GES's (upper) secondary education (Middle and High School) is not approved as a Mittelschule/Collège/Liceo by the Swiss Federal State Secretariat for Education, Research and Innovation (SERI).

References

External links
Geneva English School

British international schools in Switzerland
1961 establishments in Switzerland
Educational institutions established in 1961
Buildings and structures in the canton of Geneva
International schools in Switzerland